Undercover Agent is a 1939 American drama film directed by Howard Bretherton and starring Russell Gleason, Shirley Deane, and J. M. Kerrigan. It was released on April 5, 1939.

Cast list
 Russell Gleason as William Trent
 Shirley Deane as Betty Madison
 J. M. Kerrigan as Thomas "Pop" Madison
 Maude Eburne as Mrs. Minnow
 Oscar O'Shea as Pat Murphy
 Ralf Harolde as Bartel
 Selmer Jackson as Graham
 Ray Bennett as Pussyfoot
 Ralph Sanford as Joe Blake

References

External links
 
 

1939 films
1939 drama films
American drama films
American black-and-white films
Monogram Pictures films
1930s English-language films
1930s American films